

The Antoinette VI was an early French aircraft, flown in 1909. It was a development of the Antoinette IV, its major technological advance being that it was fitted with true ailerons, whereas the former aircraft had ailerons mounted as separate surfaces on the trailing edges of the wings. Nevertheless, Levavasseur was not satisfied with this innovation and later modified the aircraft to use a wing warping system similar to that fitted to the Antoinette V.

See also 

 Gastambide-Mengin monoplane
 Antoinette III
 Antoinette IV
 Antoinette V
 Antoinette VII
 Antoinette military monoplane
 Fedor Ivanovich Bylinkin, designer of a similar aircraft, 1910

References

 
 World Aircraft Information Files. Brightstar Publishing: London. File 889 Sheet 63.
 Hubert Latham: Windkiller

Single-engined tractor aircraft
1900s French experimental aircraft
6
High-wing aircraft
Aircraft first flown in 1909